This is a list of major commands (MAJCOM) of the United States Air Force.

A major command is a significant Air Force organization subordinate to Headquarters, US Air Force. Major commands have a headquarters staff and subordinate organizations, typically formed in numbered air forces, centers, wings, and groups.

Historically, a MAJCOM is the highest level of command, only below Headquarters Air Force (HAF), and directly above numbered air forces (NAFs).

The USAF is organized on a functional basis in the United States and a geographical basis overseas. A major command (MAJCOM) represents a major Air Force subdivision having a specific portion of the Air Force mission. Each MAJCOM is directly subordinate to Headquarters, Air Force. MAJCOMs are interrelated and complementary, providing offensive, defensive, and support elements. An operational command consists (in whole or in part) of strategic, tactical, or defense forces; or of flying forces that directly support such forces. A support command may provide supplies, weapon systems, support systems, operational support equipment, combat material, maintenance, surface transportation, education and training, or special services and other supported organizations.

From 1948 to 1991 MAJCOMs had the authority to form wings using manpower authorizations under their control.  Each MAJCOM or other organization reporting directly to USAF was assigned a block of four digit numbers to use for units it organized.  The system terminated in 1991 when USAF assumed control of all units except for provisional ones. While the majority of MAJCOM wings were support units, combat commands could (and did) create combat units on their own as shown at List of MAJCOM wings of the United States Air Force.

The USAF's last major reorganization of commands was in 1992.  In July 2006, the Air Force Network Operations (AFNETOPS) command was stood up at Barksdale Air Force Base. At the time, it was anticipated that it would be transformed into a new MAJCOM: the Air Force Cyber Command. However, this did not occur, and AFNETOPS was integrated into Air Force Space Command. 

On 20 December 2019, the United States Space Force became an independent military service and Air Force Space Command was transferred and redesignated as Space Operations Command.

Since its inception in 1947, a total of 27 organizations have been designated as major commands. Over time, the role of MAJCOMs have changed: some were replaced with NAFs, while some NAFs were replaced with MAJCOMs.

Currently, the USAF is organized into nine MAJCOMS (seven functional and two geographic), with the Air National Guard component reporting to Headquarters, United States Air Force (HAF). The most recent major command, Air Force Global Strike Command, was activated in August 2009. The other MAJCOMs have either inactivated or lost their command status.

Current

Historic

References
Donald, David, (Ed.) (1992). US Air Force Air Power Directory. Westport, CT: AIRtime Publishing Inc.

External links

 
Major Commands